Major-General Sir John Ponsonby  (25 March 1866 – 26 March 1952) was a British Army officer who commanded 5th Division during World War I.

Military career
Born the son of Sir Henry Ponsonby and educated at Eton College, Ponsonby was commissioned into the Coldstream Guards in 1888. He served in Uganda from 1898 and was seconded for service in the Second Boer War in South Africa in March 1900, and attached to the Rhodesian Field Force. He was again sent to South Africa in February 1902.

He fought in World War I, initially as commander of the 2nd Guards Brigade from 1915 and then as General Officer Commanding (GOC) 40th Division from 1917, leading his Division at the Battle of Cambrai. In July 1918 he went on to become General Officer Commanding 5th Division remaining in that role until the end of the War.

After the War he became GOC Madras District of India. He retired from the army in 1926.

He lived at Haile Hall near Beckermet in Cumbria.

Family
In 1935 he married Mary (Mollie) Robley; they had no children.

References

|-

|-

 

1866 births
1952 deaths
Italian front (World War I)
British Army personnel of the Second Boer War
People educated at Eton College
British Army generals of World War I
Knights Commander of the Order of the Bath
Companions of the Order of St Michael and St George
Companions of the Distinguished Service Order
Coldstream Guards officers